Mitchells is an unincorporated community in Culpeper County, Virginia, United States. Mitchells has a post office with ZIP code 22729.

References

Unincorporated communities in Culpeper County, Virginia
Unincorporated communities in Virginia